Honeycomb Beat (脳内覚醒ハニカムビート, Intracerebral Awakening: HONEYCOMB BEAT) is a puzzle video game developed by Hudson Soft for the Nintendo DS. It features touch screen gameplay and more than 200 unique puzzles. In the game, players use a stylus to clear puzzles.

External links
Honeycomb Beat - Review - GameSpot.com
Honeycomb Beat - Metacritic.com

2006 video games
Hudson Soft games
Nintendo DS games
Nintendo DS-only games
Puzzle video games
Video games developed in Japan
Rising Star Games games
Single-player video games